The 2017 I Love New York 355 at The Glen was a Monster Energy NASCAR Cup Series race that was held on August 6, 2017, at Watkins Glen International in Watkins Glen, New York. Contested over 90 laps on the  road course, it was the 22nd race of the 2017 Monster Energy NASCAR Cup Series season.

This marks the first NASCAR Watkins Glen race since 1992 without 4-time winner Jeff Gordon on the starting grid.

Report

Background

Watkins Glen International (nicknamed "The Glen") is an automobile race track located in Watkins Glen, New York at the southern tip of Seneca Lake. It was long known around the world as the home of the Formula One United States Grand Prix, which it hosted for twenty consecutive years (1961–1980), but the site has been home to road racing of nearly every class, including the World Sportscar Championship, Trans-Am, Can-Am, NASCAR Sprint Cup Series, the International Motor Sports Association and the IndyCar Series.

Initially, public roads in the village were used for the race course. In 1956 a permanent circuit for the race was built. In 1968 the race was extended to six hours, becoming the 6 Hours of Watkins Glen. The circuit's current layout has more or less been the same since 1971, although a chicane was installed at the uphill Esses in 1975 to slow cars through these corners, where there was a fatality during practice at the 1973 United States Grand Prix. The chicane was removed in 1985, but another chicane called the "Inner Loop" was installed in 1992 after a fatal accident during the previous year's NASCAR Winston Cup event.

The circuit is known as the Mecca of North American road racing and is a very popular venue among fans and drivers. The facility is currently owned by International Speedway Corporation.

Entry list

Practice

First practice

Final practice

Qualifying

Qualifying results

Race

First stage
Trevor Bayne and Chase Elliott reported brake issues during the pace laps prior to the start of the race. While Elliott stayed out and raced on, Bayne took his car to the garage prior to the initial start. When his team fixed the problem, he joined the race on Lap 11, 10 laps down.

Kyle Busch led the field to the green flag at 3:21 p.m. Erik Jones, running sixth, overshot the entrance to the inner-loop and came to a complete stop, as a driver is required to do in that situation, before continuing on. Multiple drivers elected to short-pit the end of the first stage on Lap 18. Busch drove unchallenged to a first stage victory on Lap 21. Elliott, who was among those that short-pitted on Lap 18, took the lead when Busch and the rest pitted under the stage break. Busch made a second stop for a lug nut stuck between the left-front tire and the wheel. During the caution, Dale Earnhardt Jr., who reported on Lap 19 that he was losing power, took his car to the garage and retired from the race with engine issues.

Second stage
The race restarted on Lap 25. Kyle Larson (fourth) and Jamie McMurray (second) pitted on Lap 29, with McMurray spending roughly 30 seconds in his pit stall, dealing with an issue on the right-front tire. Elliott pitted from the lead on Lap 31, handing it to Daniel Suárez, who held off a charging Martin Truex Jr. with an impressive block in the final corner to win the second stage on Lap 41.

Final stage

On the ensuing Lap 45 restart, Truex took the lead from Suárez exiting Turn 1. Busch and Brad Keselowski made contact in the inner-loop, sending them both spinning, though both continued on and the race stayed green. A tire carcass from Landon Cassill's car on the backstretch brought out the third caution on Lap 51. Keselowski ascended to the lead when Truex and the rest of the leaders pitted. During the caution, Kevin Harvick made contact with Brett Moffitt while exiting his pit stall as Brett entered his, dealing moderate damage to the front of Harvick's car.

The race restarted on Lap 55. Truex applied pressure for a few laps to Keselowski, before Keselowski pulled aside and allowed him to take the lead entering Turn 11 on Lap 65. By Lap 69, almost everyone was told he/she was short of the fuel needed to make it to the finish. Keselowski, who last pitted during the second stage break, was told he was six laps short of making it. Larson pitted on Lap 69, ensuring he would make it to the finish on fuel, as did Joey Logano with 15 laps to go. Elliott and Kasey Kahne pitted for fuel with nine to go, and Busch and McMurray followed suit four laps later.

While Truex was conserving his fuel load for the finish, Keselowski reeled him in and powered by his outside on the approach to the inner-loop to retake the lead with 14 to go. Unfortunately, he didn't save enough to make it to the end and pitted from the lead with three to go. Ryan Blaney took over the lead for a short time with two to go, but ran out of fuel on the approach to the inner-loop. Truex took over the lead as the white flag waved. He botched his entry into the inner-loop and locked up entering Turn 10 on the final lap, however, allowing Matt Kenseth to close in on him. But in the end, Truex drove on to victory.

Race results

Stage results

Stage 1
Laps: 20

Stage 2
Laps: 20

Final stage results

Stage 3
Laps: 50

Race statistics
 Lead changes: 6 among different drivers
 Cautions/Laps: 3 for 8
 Red flags: 0
 Time of race: 2 hours, 7 minutes and 3 seconds
 Average speed:

Media

Television
NBC Sports covered the race on the television side. Leigh Diffey and Steve Letarte had the call in the regular booth for the race; Diffey subbed for Rick Allen, who was covering the IAAF World Championship in London. Motor Racing Network broadcaster Mike Bagley had the call from the Esses, Parker Kligerman had the call from Turn 5, and Jeff Burton had the call from Turns 6 & 7. Dave Burns, Marty Snider and Kelli Stavast reported from pit lane during the race.

Radio
Motor Racing Network had the radio call for the race, which was simulcast on Sirius XM NASCAR Radio.

Standings after the race

Drivers' Championship standings

Manufacturers' Championship standings

Note: Only the first 16 positions are included for the driver standings.
. – Driver has clinched a position in the Monster Energy NASCAR Cup Series playoffs.

References

I Love New York 355 at The Glen
I Love New York 355 at The Glen
I Love New York 355 at The Glen
NASCAR races at Watkins Glen International